The women's 4 × 400 metres relay competition at the 2018 Asian Games took place on 30 August 2018 at the Gelora Bung Karno Stadium.

Schedule
All times are Western Indonesia Time (UTC+07:00)

Records

Results
Legend
DSQ — Disqualified

References

Women's 4 x 400 m relay
2018 400 women